The Bangladesh national cricket team toured the West Indies from August to September 2014 for a tour consisting of  two Test matches, three Limited Overs International (LOI) matches and one Twenty20 International. In the previous tour by Bangladesh of the West Indies in 2009, Bangladesh "whitewashed" a weakened West Indies cricket team in both the Test and LOI series.

Squads 
On 24 August 2014, the West Indies Cricket Board's Selection Panel named the 14-man squad for the 3rd and final Dhaka Bank ODI against Bangladesh and also has been added all-rounder Andre Russell to their squad for the third and final One-Day International against Bangladesh in St. Kitts. Leon Johnson was added to the West Indies team for the second and final test match due to Chris Gayle's pull-out citing personal reasons.

Tour matches

One Day: Grenada vs Bangladeshis

Three Day: Saint Kitts & Nevis v Bangladeshis

ODI series

1st ODI

2nd ODI

3rd ODI

T20I series

Only T20I

Test series

1st Test

2nd Test

Broadcasters

References

External links

2014 in Bangladeshi cricket
2014 in West Indian cricket
Bangladeshi cricket tours of the West Indies
International cricket competitions in 2014
West Indian cricket seasons from 2000–01